Live in London is the first live release by avant-garde metal band Zeal & Ardor. Released 22 March 2019, the performance captured was from a 2 December 2018 show at Electric Ballroom in London. The live album features three non-album tracks performed by the band as part of their setlist.theprp Vocalist Manuel Gagneux stated of the album "Since we're really proud of our performance, we are releasing the entire show consisting of our entire catalogue of songs."to release live in london Gagneux also stated the reason for the live album was to capture the live shows that were "more energetic and way more aggressive" than the recorded material.

"Baphomet", previously only available on the 2017 Adult Swim singles series, was released as a promotional single on 9 February 2019.

Track listing

Personnel
Zeal & Ardor
Manuel Gagneux – lead vocals and guitars, art design
Tiziano Volante - guitars
Marco von Allmen - drums, photography
Marc Obrist - backing vocals, live production
Denis Wagner - backing vocals
Mia Rafaela Dieu - bass

Production
Zebo Adam – production
Kurt Ballou – mixing
Alan Douches – mastering
Noé Herrmann - art design

References

External links

Live in London at YouTube (streamed copy where licensed)
 Live in London at Bandcamp (streamed copy where licensed)

2019 live albums
Live avant-garde metal albums
Zeal & Ardor albums
Live black metal albums